Beatrice Whitney Straight (August 2, 1914 – April 7, 2001) was an American theatre, film and television actress and a member of the prominent Whitney family. She was an Academy Award and Tony Award winner as well as an Emmy Award nominee.

Straight made her Broadway debut in The Possessed (1939). Her other Broadway roles included Viola in Twelfth Night (1941), Catherine Sloper in The Heiress (1947) and Lady Macduff in Macbeth (1948). For her role as Elizabeth Proctor in the production of The Crucible (1953), she won the Tony Award for Best Featured Actress in a Play. For the satirical film Network (1976), she won the Academy Award for Best Supporting Actress. Her performance is the shortest ever to win an Academy Award for acting, at five minutes and two seconds of screen time. She also received an Emmy Award nomination for the miniseries The Dain Curse (1978). Straight also appeared as Mother Christophe in The Nun's Story (1959) and Dr. Martha Lesh in Poltergeist (1982).

Early life
Beatrice Whitney Straight was born in Old Westbury, New York, the daughter of Dorothy Payne Whitney of the Whitney family, and Willard Dickerman Straight, an investment banker, diplomat, and career U.S. Army officer. Her maternal grandfather was political leader and financier William Collins Whitney. In 1918, when Straight was four years old, her father died in France of influenza during the great epidemic while serving with the United States Army during World War I. Following her mother's remarriage to British agronomist Leonard K. Elmhirst in 1925, the family moved to Devon, England. It was there that Straight was educated at Dartington Hall and began acting in amateur theater productions. In the 1930s, she attended the Cornish School in Seattle where many of her teachers at Dartington Hall were from and to which both she and her mother became major benefactors.

Career
Straight returned to the United States and made her Broadway debut in the play The Possessed (1939). Most of her theater work was in the classics, including Twelfth Night (1941), Macbeth (1948) and The Crucible (1953), for which she won the Tony Award for Best Featured Actress in a Play.

From its inception, Straight was a member of the Actors Studio, attending the class conducted three times weekly by founding member Robert Lewis; her classmates included Marlon Brando, Montgomery Clift, Jerome Robbins, Sidney Lumet, and about 20 others.

Straight was active in the early days of television, appearing in anthology series such as Armstrong Circle Theatre, Hallmark Hall of Fame, Kraft Television Theatre, Studio One, Suspense, The United States Steel Hour, Playhouse 90 and Alfred Hitchcock Presents, and dramatic series like Dr. Kildare, Ben Casey, The Defenders, Route 66, Mission: Impossible and St. Elsewhere. Further television performances include the role of Hippolyta in the Wonder Woman series, and Marion Hillyard, the icy, controlling mother of Stephen Collins in The Promise.

Straight worked infrequently in film and is perhaps remembered best for her role as a devastated wife confronting husband William Holden's infidelity in Network (1976). Despite her character only appearing briefly onscreen, Straight was highly praised for her performance, earning the Academy Award for Best Supporting Actress. Another widely seen film appearance was the role of the paranormal investigator Dr. Martha Lesh in the horror film Poltergeist (1982).

Personal life
On February 22, 1942, Straight married Louis Dolivet, Free French Leader, in Polk County, Iowa. At the time, Dolivet was a speaker at the National Farm Institute and Straight was in the middle of the midwest road show of Twelfth Night. Her mother Dorothy Elmhirst and stepfather Leonard K. Elmhirst attended the wedding with her brother Michael Straight and his wife Belinda Crompton. Dolivet was in the French Air Force until June 1940 and was the co-editor of The Free World, a magazine published by the International Free World Association, of which he was secretary general. At the time of the wedding, her elder brother, Whitney Straight, had been missing since August 1941, when his plane was shot down on the French coast.

Straight obtained a divorce from Dolivet in Reno, Nevada, on May 24, 1949. Together they had one child:
 Willard Whitney Straight Dolivet (1945–1952)

In 1948, while starring in the Broadway production of The Heiress, an adaptation of Henry James's Washington Square, she met Peter Cookson. They married in 1949 and remained married until Cookson's death in 1990. Peter had two children from his previous marriage, Peter W. Cookson Jr. and Jane Coopland (née Cookson).  Together, Straight and Cookson had two children: 
 Gary Cookson
 Anthony "Tony" Cookson

In 1952, her 7-year-old son, Willard, from her first marriage, accidentally drowned in a pond on their farm in Armonk while playing in a small rowboat tied to the dock. The boy was found by Cookson. The boy's father, Dolivet, who was living in Paris at the time, was refused a visa and, therefore, unable to fly to the United States to attend the funeral because of his alleged pro-communist activities, which he denied.
 
Straight reportedly had Alzheimer's disease in her last years. In 2001, she died from pneumonia in Northridge, Los Angeles, at the age of 86. Her interment was at William Henry Lee Memorial Cemetery in New Marlborough, Massachusetts.

Filmography

Film

Broadway

Television

References

External links

 
 
 
 
 
 Beatrice Straight papers, 1922-1987, held by the Billy Rose Theatre Division, New York Public Library for the Performing Arts

1914 births
2001 deaths
American film actresses
American stage actresses
American television actresses
Best Supporting Actress Academy Award winners
Tony Award winners
People from Old Westbury, New York
Whitney family
People with Alzheimer's disease
Deaths from pneumonia in California
20th-century American actresses
Actresses from New York (state)
Method actors